Illegal, unreported and unregulated fishing (IUU) is an issue around the world. Fishing industry observers believe IUU occurs in most fisheries, and accounts for up to 30% of total catches in some important fisheries.

Illegal fishing takes place when vessels or harvesters operate in violation of the laws of a fishery. This can apply to fisheries that are under the jurisdiction of a coastal state or to high seas fisheries regulated by regional fisheries management organisations (RFMO). According to the UN Food and Agriculture Organization (FAO), Fisheries and Aquaculture Department, illegal fishing has caused losses estimated at US$23 billion per year.

Unreported fishing is fishing that has been unreported or misreported to the relevant national authority or RFMO, in contravention of applicable laws and regulations.

Unregulated fishing generally refers to fishing by vessels without nationality, vessels flying the flag of a country not party to the RFMO governing that fishing area or species on the high seas, or harvesting in unregulated areas.

The drivers behind illegal, unreported and unregulated (IUU) fishing are similar to those behind many other types of international environmental crime: pirate fishers have a strong economic incentive – many species of fish, particularly those that have been over-exploited and are thus in short supply, are of high financial value.

Such IUU activity may then show a high chance of success – i.e. a high rate of return – from the failure of governments to regulate adequately (e.g. inadequate coverage of international agreements), or to enforce national or international laws (e.g. because of lack of capacity, or poor levels of governance). A particular driver behind IUU fishing is the failure of a number of flag states to exercise effective regulation over ships on their registers – which in turn creates an incentive for ships to register under these flags of convenience.

Since no one reports catches made by pirates, their level of fishing cannot be accurately quantified.

Economic and environmental impacts

One economic impact of illegal, unreported and unregulated (IUU) fishing on developing countries is the direct loss of the value of the catches that could be taken by local fishermen if the IUU fishing were not taking place.

These losses include a loss to GNP, and government revenues from landing fees, licence fees, and taxes payable by legal fishing operators. There are further indirect impacts in terms of loss of income and employment in related industries; losses in income will tend to reduce the consumer expenditures of families working in the fishing industry.

IUU harvests may be brought to market at a lower price as unfair competition to the same products from the regulated supply or as a mislabeled competing product. In either situation this illegal unregulated contribution to the market may lower the overall quality and price of products available, thus creating an economic burden on harvesters following the laws and regulations.

IUU fishing can have a significant impact on the sustainability of both the targeted species and the ecosystem. Fishing generally has the capacity to damage fragile marine ecosystems and vulnerable species such as coral reefs, turtles and seabirds. In fact, all eight sea turtle species are now endangered, and illegal fishing and hunting are two major reasons for their destruction. Regulating legitimate fisheries is aimed at mitigating such impacts, but IUU fishers rarely comply with regulations. This may reduce future productivity and biodiversity and create imbalances in the ecosystem.

This may lead to reduced food security in communities heavily dependent on fish as a source of animal protein.

IUU fishing can also lead to increased pressure on endangered fish species.  IUU fishing can directly affect the population of fish species by increasing the number of fish caught within the population in spite of population management efforts by the international community.  Indirectly, the substitution (mislabeling) of IUU caught fish for popular, but threatened or endangered species, increases the perceived supply of these species, thus decreasing the price and increasing the demand for the fish species.

Certification and labeling
Mandatory product certification and catch documentation are increasingly part of fishery monitoring and enforcement, and to exclude IUU products from consumer markets. Certification is also used for timber and for diamonds, which have analogous enforcement problems. Labels can reward harvesters and supply chains which honor regulations. Labeling may also provide accountability for adaptive management planning, as well-managed fisheries may provide higher quality products and more stable economics for producers.

The use of certification or catch document schemes is encouraged in the FAO's International Plan of Action on IUU Fishing. Several RFMOs include them, including CCAMLR's Catch Documentation Scheme for Toothfish, CCSBT's Trade Information Scheme for Southern Bluefin Tuna and ICCAT's Bluefin Tuna Statistical Document Programme. Similar systems are applied at a national level, including the USA's Certification of Origin of Tuna and Tuna Tracking and Verification Systems, Japan's reporting requirements (including area of capture) for all imports or transportation of tunas into Japan by boat, and the EU's labelling of all fish products (including area of capture).

Marine Stewardship Council
The Marine Stewardship Council (MSC) is an international non-profit organization that runs a certification and ecolabelling program for traceable, sustainable seafood.

To achieve certification as sustainable a fishery must meet a standard based on three principles:

 ensuring healthy fish stocks
 minimal impact on the marine ecosystem
 effective management (which includes ensuring the fishery operates within national and international laws).

Fisheries that meet the MSC standard for a sustainable fishery can use the blue MSC ecolabel on their seafood products.

The second element of the program is a certification for seafood traceability. This is called MSC Chain of Custody. From the fishery, every company in the supply chain that handles the certified fish is checked to ensure the MSC label is only applied to fish products that come from a certified fishery. This requires effective record-keeping and storage procedures. This traceability element of the program helps to keep illegally fished seafood out of the supply chain by linking seafood sold in shops and restaurants to a certified sustainable fishery.

The MSC eco-label enables consumers to identify sustainable seafood when shopping or dining out. As of June 2014, there are over 14,000 MSC-labelled seafood products sold in over 90 countries around the world.  The MSC website lists outlets selling MSC-certified seafood.

The six MSC-certified Patagonian toothfish and Antarctic toothfish fisheries (which are the South Georgia, Ross Sea, Heard Island, Macquarie Island, Kerguelen Islands and Falkland Islands fisheries) provide an example of how good fisheries management can reverse the trend of illegal fishing. These fisheries took, among others, the following steps to exclude illegal vessels from their waters:

 strict vessel licensing systems are rigorously enforced,
 each vessel must have at least 1 CCAMLR approved Government observer on board its vessel to verify catch data,
 each vessel must have port-to-port monitoring of its movements via two tamper-proof Vessel Monitoring System (VMS) units on board,
 all toothfish product that is transported must be accompanied by a CCAMLR Dissostichus Catch Document (DCD), with details of where and when that fish was caught

Responsible Fishing Scheme
The Responsible Fishing Scheme is the only global standard that audits compliance on board fishing vessels, including ethical and welfare criteria. First launched in 2006 by Seafish to help fishing vessels demonstrate their commitment to a responsibly sourced catch, in January 2016 a revised scheme was launched to include the health and safety and welfare of crew on board. The new scheme has been re-developed in accordance with the requirements of internationally recognised standard ISO17065. Initially focused on vessels supplying the UK market, the scheme will be rolled out internationally over the next two years.

Seafish is the UK's authority on seafood. It was founded in 1981 by an Act of Parliament and aims to support all sectors of the seafood industry for a sustainable, profitable and socially responsible future. It is the only pan-industry body offering services to all parts of the industry, from the start of the supply chain at catching and aquaculture; through processing, importers, exporters and distributors of seafood right through to restaurants and retailers. Seafish is funded by a levy on the first sale of seafood landed in the UK. Its services are intended to support and improve the environmental sustainability, efficiency and cost-effectiveness of the industry, as well as promoting responsibly-sourced seafood.

Enforcement

Illegal and unreported fishing (two of the three components of IUU fishing) essentially arise from a failure to adequately enforce existing national and international laws. There are, however, many factors underlying enforcement failure, including, notably, poor levels of national governance.

There are obvious problems with enforcing fisheries regulations on the high seas, including locating and apprehending the pirate ships, but solutions are available, chiefly through improved monitoring and surveillance systems.

Many fishermen are getting away with IUU ocean fishing due to the difficulty of monitoring every single fishing boat. This will begin to change with new technology that is able to watch and follow each boat from space consistently. This will be done through radio beacons, which all boats in the ocean are required to have. By implementing this new monitoring system, it will be impossible for fishermen to get away with IUU fishing in the future.

MSC systems are similarly of value within exclusive economic zones, including, for example, offshore patrols and licensing schemes.
The aggressive efforts of the Indonesian government to curtail illegal fishing has "reduced total fishing effort by at least 25%, ... [potentially] generate a 14% increase in catch and a 12% increase in profit." Therefore, the authors concluded that "many nations can recover their fisheries while avoiding these short-term costs by sharply addressing illegal, unreported and unregulated (IUU) fishing."

In December 2022, the United States Secretary of the Treasury issued sanctions on Pingtan Marine Enterprise and related individuals over human rights abuses tied to China-based illegal fishing.

Flag state liability
Under the United Nations Convention on the Law of the Sea, states bear responsibility for the vessels (including fishing vessels) that fly their flag. While it is uncontroversial that individuals engaged in IUU fishing may be subject to legal sanctions, the extent to which flag states may be held liable under international law for the IUU fishing activities of their vessels is less clearly defined.
	
In March 2013 the issue of flag state liability for IUU fishing was brought before the International Tribunal for the Law of the Sea in a request for an advisory opinion submitted by the Sub-Regional Fisheries Commission (SRFC) of West Africa. The SRFC asked the Tribunal to advise on the following four questions:

 What are the obligations of the flag State in cases where illegal, unreported and unregulated (IUU) fishing activities are conducted within the Exclusive Economic Zone of third party States? 
 To what extent shall the flag State be held liable for IUU fishing activities conducted by vessels sailing under its flag? 
 Where a fishing license is issued to a vessel within the framework of an international agreement with the flag State or with an international agency, shall the State or international agency be held liable for the violation of the fisheries legislation of the coastal State by the vessel in question? 
 What are the rights and obligations of the coastal State in ensuring the sustainable management of shared stocks and stocks of common interest, especially the small pelagic species and tuna?

In its submissions to the Tribunal, the SRFC emphasized the severity of the IUU fishing problem in West Africa and the need for a clear regime of flag state responsibilities with respect to vessels engaged in this trade. The SRFC argued that its member states had been unable to mount successful prosecutions against IUU fishers following boardings due to a lack of support and cooperation from flag states.
	
A number of states and international organizations also made submissions adopting a range positions with respect to the four questions above. It was held by some states that the Tribunal lacked the advisory jurisdiction to respond to these questions. Both the government of Spain, a major contributor to the problem of IUU fishing, as well as the United Kingdom adopted such a view. A number of other states took the position that flag state responsibility for IUU fishing should take the form of a general responsibility to perform due diligence with respect to vessels and their activities, rather than an obligation to assist in prosecutions or another more substantive requirement.
	
In its Advisory Opinion issued on 2 April 2015, the Tribunal adopted the "due diligence" approach. The Tribunal found that flag states are under only a general obligation to take the necessary measures to ensure that their nationals and vessels flying their flag are not engaged in IUU fishing activities. This obligation may be satisfied by adhering to generally accepted international norms of fishing vessel regulation and complying with international treaties that indicate best practices. At the same time, the Tribunal found that in coastal waters the coastal state bears primary responsibility for preventing IUU fishing and not the flag state.

Political processes

EU action plan
The EU helped draw up FAO's international plan of action to prevent, deter and eliminate IUU fishing, endorsed by the FAO Council in June 2001. The EU then developed its own plan to implement the commitments agreed at international level, and the European Commission's action plan for the eradication of IUU fishing was published in May 2002. It is intended to be implemented at four levels:

At the EU level, more responsibility will be requested with regard to member state nationals acting under a flag of convenience. Moreover, market measures concerning fisheries products caught in violation of the international agreements will be adopted. In addition, information actions addressed to the fishing industry, consumers, and the public will be launched to raise their awareness.

In the framework of Regional Fisheries Management Organisations, control and inspection plans would be adopted as well as specific conservation and management measures. In addition IUU vessels would be identified and monitored and their catches would be quantified.

At the international level, concepts like genuine link would be defined, and a number of rights and obligations of the port state would be established. Moreover, the exchange of information on IUU activities and the international co-operation would be strengthened.

In partnership with developing countries, the necessary means would be provided to enable them to effectively control fishing activities undertaken in waters under their jurisdiction.

European Commission sanctions against states operating open ship registries and flags of convenience for illegal, unreported and unregulated fishing have been effective in pressuring states to reform or limit their open ship registries to fishing vessels, or at least in severely curtailing registrations under that jurisdiction. These sanctions generally limit or ban access to the European Common Market for fisheries products produced by vessels of a certain state.

High Seas Task Force
The High Seas Task Force comprises a group of fisheries ministers and international NGOs working together to develop an action plan designed to combat IUU fishing on the high seas.

Launched in 2003, the Task Force includes fisheries ministers from Australia, Canada, Chile, Namibia, New Zealand and the UK, together with the Earth Institute, IUCN-World Conservation Union, WWF International and the Marine Stewardship Council.

The goal of the Task Force is to set priorities among a series of practical proposals for confronting the challenge of IUU fishing on the high seas. A series of expert panels have been convened to identify the legal, economic, scientific and enforcement factors that permit IUU activity to thrive, and then determine key points of leverage that can brought to bear at national, regional, and global levels to minimise the incentives to carry out IUU fishing on the high seas. The completed action plan, published on 3 March 2006, will be placed by ministerial members of the Task Force directly in the hands of other ministers.

Regional Fisheries Management Organizations 

Regional Fisheries Management Organisations (RFMOs) are affiliations of nations that co-ordinate efforts to manage fisheries in a particular region.

RFMOs may focus on certain species of fish (e.g. the Commission for the Conservation of Southern bluefin tuna) or have a wider remit related to living marine resources in general within a region (e.g. the Commission for the Conservation of Antarctic Marine Living Resources (CCAMLR)). This wide diversity of mandates and areas of application, and also effective implementation of regulations, opens up opportunities for IUU vessels.

UN high seas processes

The present system of high seas governance has evolved over a period of several hundred years, the end result being a patchwork quilt of measures in the form of binding and non-binding instruments with different geographical and legal reaches and different levels of participation.

Most legal instruments build on the foundation established by the UN Convention on the Law of the Sea, which was agreed in 1982 and entered into force in 1992.

The UN Fish Stocks Agreement, which entered into force in 2001, sets out principles for the conservation and management of fish stocks and establishes that such management must be based on the precautionary approach and the best available scientific information. The Agreement provides a framework for cooperation on conservation and management, but since only about a third of the parties to the Law of the Sea Convention have ratified it, its impact is inevitably limited.

The UN Food and Agriculture Organisation (FAO) carries out much of the technical work on international fisheries management, and provides a forum for the negotiation of agreements and codes of conduct. In 1995 the FAO agreed its Code of Conduct for Responsible Fisheries to promote long-term sustainable management.

In 2001, the FAO adopted the International Plan of Action (IPOA) on IUU Fishing. The aim of this voluntary instrument is to prevent, deter and eliminate IUU fishing by providing all states with comprehensive, effective and transparent measures by which to act, including through appropriate regional fisheries management organisations established in accordance with international law.

The FAO Compliance Agreement, which entered into force in 2003, is designed to close a major loophole in international fisheries management, that of the circumvention of fisheries regulations by ‘re-flagging‘ vessels under the flags of states that are unable or unwilling to enforce such measures.

In 2009, the FAO brokered the Agreement on Port State Measures to Prevent, Deter and Eliminate Illegal, Unreported and Unregulated Fishing, which entered into force in 2016. The agreement closes ports to vessels suspected of illegal fishing. The treaty requires that fishing vessels request permission to dock and inform the port of the details of its fishing operations. Permission to dock can be denied if unregulated fishing was occurring. The measure is intended to block illegally caught fish from entering the marketplace. Other measures in the treaty include inspections of equipment, paperwork, catches, and ship's records. Though the treaty does not compel countries to apply these measures to ships under their own flags, they may choose to do so under the agreement.

Commitments made by the FAO have seen an increase in international participation in anti IUU fishing practices. The UN Committee On Fisheries produced a report concerning the status of anti IUU fishing strategies implemented by UN member states during the 34th COFI conference. Additions to the COFI plan include the creation of a Global Record of Fishing beginning in 2017. COFI recommends that each vessel's Unique Vessel Identifier (UVI) number be uploaded to the registry. Of the various member states, the COFI report recognizes that the utilization of the record is not yet prevalent in Asia, while European, North American, and Latin American nations have added the most vessels to the record. Further recommendations by COFI mandate that the FAO continue to provide support to fisheries pursuing subsidies from the World Trade Organization. The committee also called for the establishment of on transshipment, targeted to combat the practice of transferring illegal catch between vessels, making it more difficult to track illegal fishing operations. COFI developed a series of Voluntary Guidelines for Catch Documentation Schemes (VGCDS) in 2017 in order to prevent the sale of products suspected of being attained through IUU fishing. COFI has facilitated two international workshops to assist in the implementation of these guidelines. Annexes 1-3 of the report detail the recommendations that each member state has taken to measure international progress. The 34th UN Committee on Fisheries (COFI) report on Illegal, unreported and unregistered fishing concluded that further study must be conducted on the impact of IUU fishing. The report recommended the creation of a series of volumes including previous estimates of IUU impact and a set of best practices for fielding further study.

Global goals 
The Sustainable Development Goal 14 has a target to reduce illegal, unreported and unregulated fishing as follows: "By 2020, effectively regulate harvesting and end overfishing, illegal, unreported and unregulated fishing and destructive fishing practices and implement science-based management plans, in order to restore fish stocks in the shortest time feasible, at least to levels that can produce maximum sustainable yield as determined by their biological characteristics." This target has one indicator: Indicator 14.4.1 is "the proportion of fish stocks within biologically sustainable levels". This indicator aims to measure the proportion of global fish stocks which are "overexploited", "fully exploited" and "not fully exploited". A report at the High-level Political Forum on Sustainable Development in 2021 stated that: "Sustainable fisheries accounted for approximately 0.1 per cent of global GDP in 2017".

See also

 Environmental effects of fishing
 Fisheries management
 Fisheries law
 Game law
 Game warden
 Geoff Regan
 IUU fishing in the Arctic
 IUU fishing in the Chinese fishing industry
 List of environmental issues
 The Outlaw Ocean
 Overfishing
 Poaching
 Pacific-class patrol boat
 Seafood Choices Alliance
 Vessel monitoring system

References

Further reading

 The Seafish Guide to Illegal, unreported and unregulated fishing Seafish Industry Authority
 FAO: Illegal, Unreported and Unregulated (IUU) fishing
 FAO: Stopping Illegal, Unreported and Unregulated (IUU) Fishing
 Morgan, Gary; Staples, Derek and Funge-Smith, Simon (2007) Fishing capacity management and illegal, unreported and unregulated fishing in Asia FAO RAP Publication. 2007/17. 
 Swan, Judith (2004) International action and responses by regional fishery bodies or arrangements to prevent, deter and eliminate illegal, unreported and unregulated fishing. FAO Fisheries Circular 996. ISSN 0429-9329
 Agnew DJ, Pearce J, Pramod G, Peatman T, Watson R, Beddington JR and Pitcher TJ (2009) "Estimating the Worldwide Extent of Illegal Fishing." PLoS ONE 4(2): e4570. .
 Sumaila, U.R, Alder, J., and Keith, H. (2006). Global scope and economics of illegal fishing. Marine Policy, 30(6), 696–703.